The Deryni novels are a series of historical fantasy novels by the American author Katherine Kurtz.

The first novel in the series to be published was Deryni Rising in 1970, and the most recent, The King's Deryni, was published in 2014.  As of 2016, the series consists of five trilogies, one stand-alone novel, various short stories, and two reference books.

Most of the series is set in the land of Gwynedd, one of the fictional Eleven Kingdoms (portions of King Kelson's Bride take place in the rival kingdom of Torenth).  Gwynedd itself is a medieval kingdom that roughly parallels 10th, 11th, or 12th-century England, Scotland, and Wales with a powerful Holy Church (based on the Roman Catholic Church), and a feudal government ruled by a hereditary monarchy. The population of the Eleven Kingdoms includes both humans and Deryni, a race of people with inherent psychic or magical abilities.  Throughout the course of the series, relations between humans and Deryni result in ongoing political and religious strife that is often interconnected with the individual lives of the main characters.

While the plots of the novels often involve political, ecclesiastical, and military conflicts on a grand scale, they are counterbalanced by details of the characters' personal lives.  Neither race is depicted as inherently "good" nor "evil", as both humans and Deryni are depicted as protagonists and antagonists at various points of the series.  Additionally, the novels often depict the characters engaging in various forms of magic, and such scenes vary in importance from minor events to significant plot points.

Novels

The five Deryni trilogies were published in an order which does not match the internal literary chronology of the series.  The first four trilogies alternated between the 12th and 10th centuries, while the fifth trilogy is set immediately prior to the events of the first trilogy.  The stand-alone novel, King Kelson's Bride, takes place after the third trilogy.  The trilogies are briefly listed by publication date below, with a more detailed listing after.

 Publication order
 The Chronicles of the Deryni
 The Legends of Camber of Culdi
 The Histories of King Kelson
 The Heirs of Saint Camber
 King Kelson's Bride
 The Childe Morgan Trilogy
Historical order:
 The Legends of Camber of Culdi
 The Heirs of Saint Camber
 The Childe Morgan Trilogy
 The Chronicles of the Deryni
 The Histories of King Kelson
 King Kelson's Bride

The Chronicles of the Deryni
 Deryni Rising (1970)
 November 1120: Kelson Haldane must protect his crown from a Deryni usurper.
 Deryni Checkmate (1972)
 March 1121: Alaric Morgan and Duncan McLain face the wrath of the Holy Church.
 High Deryni (1973)
 June 1121 – July 1121: Kelson Haldane attempts to repair an ecclesiastical schism on the eve of a foreign invasion.

The Legends of Camber of Culdi
 Camber of Culdi (1976)
 September 903 – December 904: The events that inspired Camber MacRorie to lead the Haldane Restoration.
 Saint Camber (1978)
 June 905 – January 907: The struggles of Camber MacRorie to protect the throne of Cinhil Haldane.
 Camber the Heretic (1981)
 January 917 – January 918: An anti-Deryni backlash sweeps through Gwynedd, threatening the lives of every Deryni in the kingdom.

The Histories of King Kelson
 The Bishop's Heir (1984)
 November 1123 – January 1124: An old political conflict threatens to erupt once again.
 The King's Justice (1985)
 May 1124 – July 1124: Kelson Haldane leads a military campaign to put down a rebellion
 The Quest for Saint Camber (1986)
 March 1125 – June 1125: A tragic accident befalls Kelson Haldane during a religious quest.

The Heirs of Saint Camber
 The Harrowing of Gwynedd (1989)
 January 918 – August 918: The Deryni desperately try to survive the persecutions.
 King Javan's Year (1992)
 June 921 – October 922: Javan Haldane struggles to secure his throne.
 The Bastard Prince (1994)
 May 928 – December 928: Rhys Michael Haldane must defend his crown from a foreign invader.

The Childe Morgan Trilogy

 In the King's Service (2003)
 Summer 1082 – November 1091: Donal Blaine Haldane seeks a Deryni protector for his sons.
 Childe Morgan (2006)
 December 1093 - March 1096: Kenneth and Alyce Morgan prepare their son Alaric for his future role.
 The King's Deryni (December 2, 2014)
 January 1099 - November 1106: A young Alaric Morgan grows up at court under the protection and friendship of King Brion Haldane.

Other novels
 King Kelson's Bride (2000)
 June 1128 – August 1128: Kelson Haldane faces the plots and intrigues of the Torenthi royal court.

Short stories
 "Swords Against the Marluk" (1977)
 Set in 1105, the story details the battle between Brion Haldane and Hogan Gwernach Furstán-Festil.  Originally published in the fourth volume of Flashing Swords!, the events of this tale are expanded upon in the Childe Morgan Trilogy.
 The Deryni Archives (1986)
 A collection of short stories that take place at different points throughout Gwyneddan history. All of the stories were written by Katherine Kurtz.
 "Catalyst": In the fall of 888, a young Rhys Thuryn discovers his abilities as a Healer. This story was first published in Moonsinger's Friends in 1985.
 "Healer's Song": In August of 914, Rhys Thuryn and his wife celebrate the birth of their new son. This story was first published in Fantasy Book in 1982.
 "Vocation": In December 977, a reluctant noble feels the lure of a religious life. This story was first published in Nine Visions in 1983.
 "Bethane": In the summer of 1100, a bitter old woman encounters a group of young Deryni nobles. This story was first published in Hecate's Cauldron in 1982.
 "The Priesting of Arilan": From August 1104 to February 1105, Denis Arilan attempts to become the first Deryni priest in two centuries.
 "Legacy": In June 1105, Charissa Furstána-Festila relates the tale of her father's battle with King Brion Haldane. This story was first published in Fantasy Book in 1983.
 "The Knighting of Derry": In May 1115, Sean Lord Derry travels to the royal court and meets Duke Alaric Morgan.
 "Trial": In the spring of 1118, Alaric Morgan observes the trial of an accused murderer.
 "Venture in Vain" (2001)
 Set in the year 1089, only 300 copies of this rare, limited-edition short story were published.
 Deryni Tales (2002)
 A collection of short stories written by fans of the Deryni series.  Katherine Kurtz edited the collection and contributed an additional short story of her own. Kurtz' story, "The Green Tower", is set in 1052 and tells the tale of two young girls and the events surrounding a dangerous magical experiment.

Reference books
 Deryni Magic (1990)
 A companion book to the series that details the fictional style of magic used by the Deryni, including both natural psychic abilities and complex arcane rituals.
 Codex Derynianus (1998)
 Written by Katherine Kurtz and Robert Reginald, this book is a comprehensive encyclopedia of the people and places in the Deryni series, including maps and genealogical charts.  The first edition of the book was a limited-edition hardcover slipcase of which only 500 were printed.  In 2005, a second edition of the book was published as a trade paperback, and it was updated to include information from King Kelson's Bride.

Setting

Most of the books are set in the fictional Kingdom of Gwynedd, one of the Eleven Kingdoms. The other kingdoms are Bremagne, The Connait, Howicce, Llannedd, Kheldour, Meara, Mooryn, Orsal, Tralia, and Torenth.

Citations

General sources 
 Katherine Kurtz, Camber of Culdi, 
 Katherine Kurtz, Saint Camber, 
 Katherine Kurtz, Camber the Heretic, 
 Katherine Kurtz, The Harrowing of Gwynedd, 
 Katherine Kurtz, King Javan's Year, 
 Katherine Kurtz, The Bastard Prince, 
 Katherine Kurtz, In the King's Service, 
 Katherine Kurtz, Childe Morgan, 
 Katherine Kurtz, The King's Deryni,  
 Katherine Kurtz, Deryni Rising, 
 Katherine Kurtz, Deryni Checkmate, 
 Katherine Kurtz, High Deryni, 
 Katherine Kurtz, The Bishop's Heir, 
 Katherine Kurtz, The King's Justice, 
 Katherine Kurtz, The Quest for Saint Camber, 
 Katherine Kurtz, King Kelson's Bride, 
 Katherine Kurtz, The Deryni Archives, 
 Katherine Kurtz and Robert Reginald, Codex Derynianus (second edition), 
 Deryni FAQ

External links
 Deryni Destination, the official website of Katherine Kurtz & all things Deryni 
 Deryni Archives—The Magazine
 The official chat of Katherine Kurtz (IRC)

 
Fantasy novel series
American fantasy novels
American novel series